The following is a list of episodes for the television series Mighty Max.

Series overview

Episodes

Season 1 (1993)

Season 2 (1994)

References

Mighty Max (TV series)